Palmerston North Boys' High School is a traditional boys school located in Palmerston North, New Zealand.

Location
Palmerston North Boys' High School has a campus located on Featherston Street between Rangitikei and North Streets in the central city. There are secondary entrances to the school on Wellesbourne Street, Ivanhoe Terrace, Edgeware Road and North Street. The rear boundary is shared with Queen Elizabeth College.

Students and school culture
Most of the school's approximately 1,700 students are "day boys" from Palmerston North and surrounding townships such as Ashhurst, Levin, and Feilding. Around 170 boys are housed in an onsite boarding hostel – College House (also known as 'Murray House,' after former Rector John Murray; his former home is part of the hostel).

History and controversy

In 1902, Palmerston North High School was established as a co-educational secondary school with an initial roll of 84 students (40 boys and 44 girls, the first person being on the roll was a girl). The first classes were held at St Andrew's Presbyterian Church Sunday School hall. In 1920, Palmerston North High School was split into two single-sex schools: Palmerston North Girls' High School and Palmerston North Boys' High School.

In a 1990 case, M & R v Syms and the Board of Trustees of Palmerston North Boys High School [2003] NZAR 705, the plaintiffs challenged the steps taken by the rector in suspending both students for consumption of alcohol, and later by the board expelling M. McGechan J gave judgment for the plaintiffs holding that the rector's discretion as to whether to suspend the pupils "is not to be ignored, as if non-existent. Nor is it to be fettered by a principal through self-imposed rules permitting no exceptions". The judge further found that the board did not exercise its mind on the ultimate discretion whether or not to uplift suspension or procure removal.

In September 2006 the school had an outbreak of tuberculosis in which a substantial number of students contracted a latent form of tuberculosis, as well as a small number of students who had active tuberculosis. There was a second, smaller outbreak in 2010.

The then-rector, Tim O'Connor, was awarded a Woolf Fisher Fellowship and the Sir Peter Blake Leadership Award in 2007.

Rectors 
The school has had ten rectors since 1902:

Facilities

The school has the following facilities:

These include:
 Library
 ICT computer suites
 Specialised technology/workshop block
 College House – Boarding facilities for approximately 180 students
 War Memorial Gallery and archive room

College House
College House is a boarding facility for approximately 180 students
College House provides seven day boarding for students that attend Palmerston North Boys' High School. Seven day boarding means that students can remain in the hostel during the weekends. Parents apply for weekend leave to allow their sons to go home in any given weekend.

Teaching blocks
The school has 12 main teaching blocks. These include:
H Block - drama & english
M Block - music
E Block - commerce & social studies
S Block - science
G Block
C Block
A Block
B Block
T Block - technology
F Block - art
P Block
D Block

Cultural

 Ian Colquhoun Memorial Hall – 1700-seat auditorium
 The Speirs Centre
Recording facilities
Rehearsal rooms
David A. Syms Auditorium – 400-seat theatre
 Little Theatre – 80-seat theatre

Sporting

 Two multiuse gymnasiums
Full-sized basketball court
Weights room
Heated indoor swimming pool
Two rugby fields
Football field
Three artificial cricket wickets and a grass wicket
Cricket training nets
Astroturf all-weather tennis and hockey courts
Two sports pavilions
Grandstand

Clubs
Palmerston North Boys' High School is divided into six 'clubs'. On enrolment students are placed in a club at random, or into a house with a family tie (the same as his brothers, father, grandfather or uncles). Staff are also placed in clubs, with the exception of the Rector.

The clubs names and colours are as follows:

Murray Club, also known as College House, is composed of the school's boarding students.

The Clubs compete in sports and codes, including team sports, individual sports, and whole club activities, such as Road-Race and Marching competitions. For each code the clubs are ranked first to last, with the winning club gaining one point, and the loser gaining six. The club with the fewest points at the end of the school year wins the Shand Shield.

Sports
The school has experienced success nationally in sports such as football, cycling, badminton, squash, basketball, hockey and rugby.

The rugby union 1st XV plays in an all-white strip. Other rugby teams from Boys' High are likely to play in blue and white hooped jerseys, similar to Auckland or St Kentigern College.

Notable alumni

Sport

Cricket
 Jamie How – Black Caps 
 Adam Milne – Black Caps
 Jacob Oram – Black Caps
 David O'Sullivan – Black Caps
 Victor Pollard – Black Caps and All White 
 Mathew Sinclair – Black Caps
 Ian Smith –  Black Caps and commentator
 Derek Stirling – Black Caps
 Ross Taylor – Black Caps
 George Worker – Black Caps 
 Bryan Yuile – Black Caps

Cycling
 Jesse Sergent – Olympic bronze medalist
 Simon van Velthooven- Olympic bronze medalist

Football
 Stu Jacobs – All Whites, New Zealand Olympic coach
 Steven Old – All Whites 
 Jarrod Smith – All Whites 
 Alex Rufer – All Whites 
 Adrian Elrick – All Whites

Hockey
 Nick Wilson – Black Sticks
 Hayden Phillips - Black Sticks

Kayaking
 Ian Ferguson – Olympic gold medalist
 Ben Fouhy – Olympic silver medalist

Motor Racing
 Brendon Hartley – 2015 FIA World Endurance Championship
 Jono Lester – Japanese Super GT 
 Chris Pither – V8 Supercars

Rugby
 Kurt Baker – IRB Sevens player, Manawatu and Taranaki representative
 Josh Bradnock – Hurricanes
 Francis Bryant – Manawatu Turbos
 Dean Budd - Italy, Benetton
 Craig Clare – Bay of Plenty 
 Aaron Cruden – All Blacks 
 Jason Eaton – All Blacks
 Jason Emery – Manawatu Turbos, Highlanders
 Ma'afu Fia – Highlanders 
 Mark Finlay – All Blacks
 Ben Funnell – Crusaders 
 Hamish Gard – Canterbury
 Jackson Hemopo - All Blacks, Highlanders, Manawatu Turbos
 Emosi Koloto – Manawatu, Wellington and Tonga
 Ngani Laumape – All Blacks, Hurricanes, Manawatu Turbos
 Johnny Leota – Highlanders
 Lifeimi Mafi – Munster
 Hadleigh Parkes – Scarlets, Southern Kings, Welsh Grand Slam Winner.
 Liam Squire - All Blacks, Highlanders, Tasman Mako
 Andre Taylor –  New Zealand Maori
 Jade Te Rure – Manawatu Turbos, Edinburgh
 Brent Thompson – Hurricanes
 Rob Thompson- Canterbury, Highlanders, Maori All Blacks
 Doug Tietjens – Highlanders
 Grant Webb – Newport Gwent Dragons
 Craig Wickes – All Blacks

Rugby League
 Emosi Koloto – New Zealand Kiwis
 Ngani Laumape – New Zealand Warriors (rugby league), Hurricanes, Manawatu (rugby union), All Blacks

Golf
 Craig Perks – former PGA tour golfer

Politics and public service
 Harold Barrowclough (1894–1972), Chief Justice of New Zealand (1953–1966)
 Douglas Carter (1908–1988), National MP representing the Raglan electorate
 Trevor de Cleene (1933–2001), Labour MP representing the Palmerston North electorate
 Gaven Donne (1914–2010), Chief Justice of Samoa, Niue, the Cook Islands, Nauru and Tuvalu
 Jonathan Hunt (born 1938), Speaker of the House and High Commissioner to the United Kingdom
 Major-General Brian Poananga (1924–1995), Chief of the General Staff, New Zealand Army
 Grant Smith, Mayor of Palmerston North (2015–present).

Television
 Shane Cortese – NZ theatre and TV actor
 Peter Land – UK theatre and TV actor
 Hamish McKay – NZ television presenter
 Richard Wilkins – television presenter
 Jed Brophy – TV and film actor – Lord of the Rings
 Clarke Gayford – Fisherman and TV personality
 Jeremy Corbett - TV presenter - Comedian

Other
 H. W. Gretton –  poet, lyricist, teacher, journalist, diarist and soldier
 Simon Grigg - music industry entrepreneur, archivist and writer
 Aaron Hape – Fellow of the Royal Society of Arts
 Fred Hollows – ophthalmologist
 Bob McDowall – freshwater fish scientist
 Barry Mora – opera singer
 Simon Moutter - CEO of Spark NZ
 David Shand - International Civil servant
 Colin Webster-Watson – artist 
 Guthrie Wilson – novelist and educator 
 Gregor W. Yeates – scientist

See also 
 Palmerston North Girls' High School

References

Further reading
 Murray, J. "Palmerston North Boys' High School: An Historical Survey", Palmerston North, 1952
 Browne, R., ed. "The Palmerstonian" Vol. 104, 2010

External links
 Palmerston North Boys High School Website
 Angelfire – Palmerston North High School

Boarding schools in New Zealand
Boys' schools in New Zealand
Educational institutions established in 1902
Schools in Palmerston North
Secondary schools in Manawatū-Whanganui
1902 establishments in New Zealand